Barasat Mahatma Gandhi Memorial High School is a higher secondary boys' school located at Nabapally in  Barasat, Kolkata, North 24 Parganas, West Bengal, India.

History
The school was established with 38 students on 26 February 1948, as Barasat Government School, just after the death of Mahatma Gandhi.

Subjects
The curriculum is as per the West Bengal Board of Secondary Education (till class 10) and West Bengal Council of Higher Secondary Education (classes 11 and 12). The common curriculum is followed till class 10. In class 11 and 12, all three streams, science, commerce. and arts. are offered.

References

External links 
 

Boys' schools in India
Primary schools in West Bengal
High schools and secondary schools in West Bengal
Schools in North 24 Parganas district
Barasat
Educational institutions established in 1948
1948 establishments in West Bengal